Piero Braglia (born 10 January 1955) is an Italian football manager and former player, currently in charge of Serie C club Gubbio.

Career

Playing
A midfielder, Braglia started his professional career with Serie C team Montevarchi, then making his debut in the Serie A in 1976 with Fiorentina. He then spent six seasons with Catanzaro, five of them being in the Italian top flight. He then retired in 1987 after spells with Serie B teams Triestina and Catania.

Coaching
In 1989 Braglia accepted his first managerial job, at the helm of amateur Tuscan team Bibbienese. He then coached a number of Tuscan teams in the lower ranks of Italian football with some success, including a Serie C2 title with Montevarchi in 1995.

In 1999, he accepted his first coaching job outside of Tuscany, becoming head coach of Foggia in the Serie C2, obtaining a fourth place in the final table. He then returned to Tuscany, again to Montevarchi, before to join Chieti, which he led for two seasons in the Serie C1 league. In 2003–04 he returned to Catanzaro, this time as a head coach, and led the giallorossi to win the Serie C1 title and establish them back in Serie B after over a decade in the lower tiers. He was however sacked during the club's following Serie B campaign due to poor results. He then returned in Tuscany, joining Sangiovannese, a team he already twice in the Serie D during his early coaching years, and achieving an impressive third place in their Serie C1 campaign. In 2006, he accepted an offer from Pisa, with the aim to lead the nerazzurri back to Serie B; a third place in the regular season, followed by a successful campaign in the promotion playoffs, assured Pisa and Braglia a place in the second-highest Italian league for the next season. However, after discussions with the club management, Braglia opted to leave Pisa and accept an offer from Lucchese, another Tuscan Serie C1 team with aims of promotions. However, despite this, Lucchese ended only in eighth place and failed to qualify to the promotion playoffs.

In June 2008 Braglia was unveiled as head coach of Serie B team Frosinone, replacing Alberto Cavasin.

In June 2009 Piero Braglia went to Taranto, but was removed weeks later due to poor results. In June 2010 he was announced as new head coach of Juve Stabia, which he led to a surprise promotion to Serie B via the playoffs. He was then confirmed as Juve Stabia boss for the 2011–12 second division campaign, where he guided his small club to an impressive first season half and a good ninth place by the end of the season. Another safe season followed, with Juve Stabia keeping its Serie B status for one more year. These fortunes did not repeat in the 2013–14 season, as Juve Stabia immediately appeared unable to escape relegation and Braglia was fired in November 2013 to be replaced with Fulvio Pea; after Pea's failure to improve results, Braglia was however called back at Juve Stabia, but could not do anything to avoid Lega Pro relegation to his club.

In July 2014, Braglia agreed a comeback at the helm of Pisa, seven years after he guided them to what was the last Serie B promotion to date for the Nerazzurri of Tuscany.

On 12 October 2015 he became the head coach of Lecce. He led the club to the third place and thus entered the play-off round, where Lecce lost in the semifinal.

On 15 June 2016 he was appointed new manager of Alessandria. He was exonerated on 15 April 2017, three days before the end, due to the sudden collapse of results that led to overtaking the Cremonese at the top of Group A Lega Pro, after a long domination of the piedmont team.

On 27 September 2017 he was hired as the head coach of Cosenza in the Serie C. With the calabrian club, on 16 June 2018, he won the final of the Serie C playoffs against Robur Siena, with a score of 3–1 at the Stadio Adriatico in Pescara. Thus, Cosenza returns to Serie B after 15 years.

On his first season in charge at the club in Serie B, he comfortably succeeded in keeping Cosenza into the safer spots of the league table, ending in tenth place, just four points shy of a promotion playoff spot. However, the 2019–20 Serie B campaign did not prove to be as successful, and Braglia was sacked on 10 February 2020 following a 0–1 home loss to Benevento which left Cosenza in deep relegation zone (18th place).

In July 2020 he was appointed at the helm of Serie C club Avellino. Braglia served in charge of the Biancoverdi until 16 February 2022, when he was dismissed, together with director of football Salvatore Di Somma, following a 0–1 defeat to Virtus Francavilla.

On 17 June 2022, Braglia was announced as the new head coach of Serie C club Gubbio.

References

External links
Piero Braglia at Soccerway

Living people
1955 births
People from Grosseto
Association football midfielders
Italian footballers
Italian football managers
Serie A players
Serie B players
U.S. Cremonese players
ACF Fiorentina players
U.S. Catanzaro 1929 players
U.S. Triestina Calcio 1918 players
Catania S.S.D. players
Calcio Foggia 1920 managers
U.S. Catanzaro 1929 managers
Pisa S.C. managers
Frosinone Calcio managers
S.S. Juve Stabia managers
Cosenza Calcio managers
A.S. Gubbio 1910 managers
Sportspeople from the Province of Grosseto
Footballers from Tuscany